Hardy is an unincorporated community and census-designated place (CDP) in Cascade County, Montana, United States. It is in the southwest part of the county, in the valley of the Missouri River where it emerges from its canyon through the Adel Mountains Volcanic Field. Interstate 15 passes the community, with access from Exit 247. I-15 leads northeast  to Great Falls and southwest  to Helena. 

The Hardy Bridge crosses the Missouri River in the southern part of the CDP, carrying the former route of U.S. Route 91. Tower Rock State Park is in the northern part of the CDP.

Hardy was first listed as a CDP prior to the 2020 census.

Demographics

References 

Census-designated places in Cascade County, Montana
Census-designated places in Montana